Wladyslaw Skonecki  (13 July 1920 – 12 June 1983) was a Polish tennis player.

Career
Skonecki was born in Tomsk, in the Soviet Union on 13 July 1920. He played his first tournament in 1945 at the Polish National Championships.

His career highlights include winning of Budapest International Championships in 1949, Monte Carlo Championships in 1953 and 1955, the Italian Riviera Championships at San Remo in 1953, 1954, the Ortisei Tournament 1953, In 1955 he also won titles at Beaulieu, Gallia Cannes, Menton, Nice and the Queens Covered Court Championships. 

In addition he won the British Covered Court Championships in 1955, the Central India Championships in 1955 and 1956, and the Ceylon Championships in 1955. Also in 1955 he won the South of France Championships In 1958 he won the West Berlin Championships. He won his final tournament at the Polish Indoors in 1965. Skonecki played his final tournament at the Aix-en-Provence Golden Racket Trophy in Aix-en-Provence, France in 1967. He died in Vienna, Austria on 12 June 1983.

References

External links
 
 
 

1920 births
1983 deaths
Polish male tennis players
People from Tomsk
Soviet emigrants to Poland
Polish expatriates in Austria